The following is a list of prominent people belonging to the Meitei people.

Artists

Poets and writers
 Angom Gopi, poet, writer
 Rajkumar Shitaljit Singh, writer

Athletes

 Dingko Singh , Boxer, Asian Games gold medalist
 Saikhom Mirabai Chanu , weightlifting, Olympic medallist

Entertainers

Actors/Actresses
 Kaiku Rajkumar

Musicians
 Hamom Sadananda

Politicians

 N. Biren Singh, current Chief Minister of Manipur

Scholars and Social activists

 Irom Chanu Sharmila

Other notables

Military and gallantry award recipients
 Laishram Jyotin Singh, Ashok Chakra Recipient

See also
List of people by nationality

References

Manipur-related lists

Meitei